The 122nd district of the Texas House of Representatives contains parts of Bexar County. The current Representative is Lyle Larson, who was first elected in 2010.

References 

122